Recuérdame is Spanish for "remember me". It may refer to:

Recuérdame (Yolandita Monge album), 1971 album or the title song
"Recuérdame" (La 5ª Estación song), 2009 song
"Recuérdame" (Pablo Alborán song), 2014 song by Pablo Alborán from the album Terral
"Recuérdame", an entry by Samuel & Patricia in competition for Spain in the Eurovision Song Contest 2010
"Recuérdame", 2015 song by Maluma from Pretty Boy, Dirty Boy
"Recuérdame", 2001 song by Laura Pausini from Entre tú y mil mares (the Spanish-language version of Tra te e il mare)
"Recuérdame", the Spanish version of "Remember Me", a 2017 song from the film Coco written by Robert Lopez and Kristen Anderson-Lopez

See also
"Recorda Me", a track by Joe Henderson from Page One, 1963
Remember Me (disambiguation)